Evan Williams (18 June 1906 – 18 November 1976) was a Welsh rugby union, and professional rugby league footballer who played in the 1920s and 1930s.

Background
Williams was born in Port Talbot, Wales, he died aged 70 in Leeds, West Yorkshire, England.

Playing career

International honours
Evan Williams won two caps for Wales (RU) while at Aberavon RFC in 1925 against England and Scotland. Evans won his first cap aged 18 which at the time made him the second youngest player to represent Wales after Norman Biggs in 1888.

Championship final appearances
Evan Williams played right-, i.e. number 3, in Leeds' 2-8 defeat by Hunslet in the Championship Final during the 1937–38 season at Elland Road, Leeds on Saturday 30 April 1938.

Challenge Cup Final appearances
Evan Williams played  in Leeds' 11-8 victory over Swinton in the 1931–32 Challenge Cup Final during the 1931–32 season at Central Park, Wigan on Saturday 9 April 1932, and played , and scored 3-goals in the 18-2 victory over Warrington in the 1935–36 Challenge Cup Final during the 1935–36 season at Wembley Stadium, London on Saturday 18 April 1936.

Club career
Evan Williams made his début for Leeds, and scored a try in 61-3 the victory over Bradford Northern on Saturday 7 November 1925.

Personal life
Evan Williams' marriage to Eunice (née John) was registered during third ¼ 1926 in Leeds district. They had four children, Evan Rowland (birth registered during first ¼ 1927 in Leeds district), Bryan (birth registered during fourth ¼ 1929 in Leeds North district), Barrie (birth registered during second ¼ 1932 in Leeds North district), and Gwynneth A. (birth registered during fourth ¼ 1947 in Leeds district).

References

External links
Search for "Williams" at rugbyleagueproject.org

1906 births
1976 deaths
Aberavon RFC players
Leeds Rhinos players
Rugby league centres
Rugby league five-eighths
Rugby league halfbacks
Rugby league players from Port Talbot
Rugby union centres
Rugby union players from Port Talbot
Wales international rugby union players
Welsh rugby league players
Welsh rugby union players